Philaretos is a masculine Greek given name meaning "lover of virtue". Notable people with the name include:

Saint Philaretos, 8th-century Anatolian saint
Philaretos Brachamios (died c. 1087), Byzantine general of Armenian origin

See also
Filaret (disambiguation)
Filarete